Carmen is the first distrito of San José Canton in Costa Rica, and one of the four administrative units that form San José downtown. This district is not heavily populated although it is a busy downtown area in daytime.

Geography
Carmen lies in the north of the San José Canton. It is surrounded by other districts (going clockwise): Goicoechea Canton (north) and Montes de Oca Canton (east) from San José Province. The District borders other districts of San José Canton, Catedral District (south) and Merced District (west).

Carmen has an area of 1.47 km² and an elevation of 1156 metres.

District information
This district comprises several barrios or neighbourhoods, such as Barrio Amón, Barrio Aranjuez, part of Barrio La California, El Carmen, El Empalme, Barrio Escalante and Barrio Otoya. Between its boundaries there are many important institutions and buildings, including government, health and culture.

 Asamblea Legislativa de Costa Rica – Costa Rica's Legislative Assembly building
 Hospital Calderón Guardia – One of the country's three main hospitals
 Biblioteca Nacional de Costa Rica – Costa Rica's national library
 National Insurance Institute – Government-controlled monopoly enterprise for Costa Rica's insurance business
 Atlántico railway station - Main railway station hub of the Interurbano Line train

Demographics 

For the 2011 census, Carmen had a population of 2702 inhabitants.

Transportation

Road transportation 
The district is covered by the following road routes:
 National Route 218

Rail transportation 
The Interurbano Line operated by Incofer goes through this district.

References

External links
Municipalidad de San José. Distrito Carmen – Website of San Jose Mayor, includes a map of the district and related info.

Districts of San José Province
Populated places in San José Province